Kastl is a municipality in the district of Amberg-Sulzbach in Bavaria in Germany.
A notable part of the village is Kastl Abbey, one of the monasteries in the area.

References

External links
 official homepage of the municipality Kastl 

Amberg-Sulzbach